Eskil Augustus Brodd (28 August 1885 – 2 October 1969) was a Swedish diver who competed in the 1912 Summer Olympics. He finished sixth in a heat of the 3 m springboard event and did not advance to the final.

References

External links

1885 births
1969 deaths
Swedish male divers
Olympic divers of Sweden
Divers at the 1912 Summer Olympics
People from Uppsala Municipality
Sportspeople from Uppsala County